Moulaye Ould Mohamed Laghdaf (born 1957) served as the Prime Minister of Mauritania from August 2008 until August 2014.

Life and career
Laghdaf was born in Néma. An engineer and a member of the Tajakant tribe, he became Mauritania's Ambassador to Belgium and the European Union in 2006 before being appointed as Prime Minister by junta leader Mohamed Ould Abdel Aziz on August 14, 2008. His appointment followed a military coup earlier in the month, and some suggested that he might have been appointed in hopes that doing so would improve Mauritania's foreign relations, given Laghdaf's diplomatic service in Europe. Laghdaf was already viewed as being closely associated with Abdel Aziz prior to his appointment.

On August 26, the Rally of Democratic Forces (RFD), the Alliance for Justice and Democracy - Movement for Renovation (AJD-MR), and the Movement for Direct Democracy (MDD) announced their decision to not participate in the Laghdaf's government because the junta had not clarified whether or not someone serving in the military would be allowed to stand as a presidential candidate and had not specified how long it intended to remain in power. The new government led by Laghdaf was appointed on August 31 and announced on television early on September 1. This government was composed of 28 members, aside from Laghdaf, and its members were considered to be politically obscure technocrats. The government included several members of the RFD, despite that party's refusal to participate; the RFD responded by saying that the RFD members who had accepted posts in the government had "automatically resigned" from the party by doing so.

Laghdaf announced on September 6, 2008 that an "open and constructive debate" would be held, in which members of parliament, political parties, and other organizations would be invited to participate. The purpose of this debate, according to Laghdaf, was to determine a timetable for holding a new election and consider various matters related to that election, including proposals for constitutional amendments and improved delineation of executive and legislative powers.

As part of a deal with the opposition, a national unity government was formed in June 2009 to lead the country at the time of the July 2009 presidential election; Laghdaf was retained as Prime Minister. Abdel Aziz then won the presidential election and took office as president on August 5, 2009; Laghdaf resigned as Prime Minister, but Abdel Aziz reappointed him to lead a new, 27-member government on August 11.

Laghdaf was replaced as Prime Minister by Yahya Ould Hademine in August 2014. He was instead appointed as Secretary-General of the Presidency, with the rank of minister, on 19 January 2015.

In 2021 he was jailed for corruption.

References

External links
Photo of Laghdaf

1957 births
Living people
Mauritanian diplomats
Prime Ministers of Mauritania
Ambassadors of Mauritania to the European Union
Ambassadors of Mauritania to Belgium
People from Hodh Ech Chargui Region
Mauritanian Moors